This is a list of mountain passes — generally called notches — in New Hampshire in the United States.

White Mountains

Northern New Hampshire

Southern New Hampshire

References